John Morgan may refer to:

Academics
John Morgan (economist) (born 1967), American economist
John Morgan (etiquette expert) (1959–2000), British expert on etiquette
John Morgan (mathematician) (born 1946), mathematician at Stony Brook University
John Minter Morgan (1782–1855), author and philanthropist
John Henry Morgan (born 1945), American professor of the history and philosophy of social science
J. R. Morgan (born 1950), classicist and author, Swansea University

Entertainment
John Morgan (poet) (1688–c. 1733), Welsh clergyman, scholar and poet
John Morgan (artist) (1822–1885), British painter
John Morgan (comedian) (1930–2004), Welsh-born Canadian comedian
John Morgan (sportscaster) (born 1950), American broadcaster and television producer
John Morgan (The Wurzels) (1941–2021), drummer for The Wurzels

Military
John Morgan (admiral) (born 1950), United States Navy admiral
John Hunt Morgan (1825–1864), Confederate general during the American Civil War
J. H. Morgan (1876–1955), British general and lawyer
John C. Morgan (1914–1991), United States Army Air Forces pilot and Medal of Honor recipient

Politics

Canada
John W. Morgan (born 1964), mayor (2000-2012) of Cape Breton Regional Municipality, Nova Scotia

UK
John Morgan (by 1524 – will proved 1559) (died 1550s), MP for Monmouth Boroughs
John Morgan (fl. 1563), MP for Carmarthen Boroughs
John Morgan (died by 1572), MP for Leominster
John Morgan (merchant) (died 1715), Member of Parliament for Monmouth, 1701–1705
Sir John Morgan, 2nd Baronet (c. 1650–1693), Member of Parliament for Radnor, 1681, and Herefordshire, 1685–1693
John Morgan (of Rhiwpera) (1671–1720), Member of Parliament for Monmouthshire, 1701–1720
Sir John Morgan, 4th Baronet (1710–1767), Member of Parliament for Hereford, 1734–1741, and Herefordshire, 1765–1767
John Morgan (of Dderw) (1742–1792), Member of Parliament for Brecon, 1769–1771, and Monmouthshire, 1771–1792
John Morgan (British politician) (1892–1940), Labour MP for Doncaster, 1938–1941
John Lloyd Morgan (1861–1944), Welsh MP for West Carmarthenshire, 1889–1910

U.S.
John G. Morgan (Tennessee politician)
John Hill Morgan (1870–1945), American lawyer, politician, and art expert
John J. Morgan (1770–1849), U.S. Representative from New York
John Tyler Morgan (1824–1907), U.S. Senator
John Morgan (Wisconsin politician) (1846–1926), member of the Wisconsin State Assembly in 1917
John S. Morgan (born 1963), member of the Maryland House of Delegates
John T. Morgan (judge) (c. 1830–1910), Chief Justice of the Idaho Supreme Court

Religion
John Morgan (archdeacon of Bangor) (1840–1924)
John Morgan (archbishop of Wales) (1886–1957), Archbishop of Wales, 1949–1957
John Morgan (bishop of St David's) (died 1504)
John Morgan (missionary) (1806–1865), New Zealand missionary
John Morgan (dean of Waterford), Dean of Waterford, 1877–1903
John Hamilton Morgan (1842–1894), leader and missionary in the LDS Church
John Aloysius Morgan (1909–2008), Australian prelate of the Roman Catholic Church

Sports

Association football (soccer)
John Morgan (footballer, born 1855) (1855–1937), Welsh international footballer
John Morgan (footballer, born 1876) (1876–?), Welsh international footballer
Jock Morgan (John Morgan, 1889–1983), Scottish footballer

Other sports
Pepper Morgan (John L. Morgan, fl. 1930s), American baseball player
John Adams Morgan (born 1930), American Olympic sailor
John Morgan (golfer) (1943–2006), English golfer
John Morgan (Australian footballer) (born 1953), Australian rules footballer for Melbourne
John Morgan (wrestler) (born 1963), American Olympic wrestler
John Morgan (rugby league) (fl. 1960s–1970s), Australian rugby league footballer
John Morgan (cricketer) (born 1977), English cricketer
John E. Morgan (born 1977), English golfer
John Morgan (mixed martial arts journalist) (born 1978), American mixed martial arts journalist
John Morgan (swimmer) (fl. 1984–1992), American Paralympic gold medal-winning swimmer

Others
John Morgan (physician) (1735–1789), founder of first medical school in colonial America at University of Pennsylvania
John Morgan (British journalist) (1929–1988), Welsh journalist and broadcaster
John Morgan (lawyer) (born 1956), lawyer, founder of the Morgan & Morgan law firm
John Morgan (of Tredegar), Welsh nobleman
J. P. Morgan Jr. (1867–1943), American banker
J. P. Morgan (1837–1913), American banker

Other uses
SS John Morgan, 1943 World War II liberty ship

See also 
John H. Morgan (disambiguation)
Morgan (surname)